Kiveton Hall is a Grade II listed house in Kiveton Park, Wales, near Rotherham, South Yorkshire, England.

History

The house was built on the side of a previous house, also named Kiveton Park, that was built between 1698 and 1704 for Thomas Osborne, 1st Duke of Leeds, and it was demolished in 1811.  The current house was built later, in the early part of the 19th century.

Architecture

The house is built in limestone on a plinth, and it has a floor band and a slate roof.  There are two storeys and an attic, fronts of three and two bays, and a rear wing on the left containing the entrance.  In the centre is a single-storey canted bay window, and the other windows are a mix of sashes and casements.

Associated buildings

Associated with the house are four buildings listed at Grade II.  These are the ha-ha to the east of the house, the main gate piers, the end sections of two outbuildings at Kiveton Hall Farm, and the section of the wall flanking the south side of the drive to Kiveton Hall.

References

Citations

Sources

 

Buildings and structures in the Metropolitan Borough of Rotherham
Grade II listed buildings in South Yorkshire